Costanza Sforza of Santa Fiora (1550–1617) was an Italian noblewoman. By birth she was member of the powerful House of Sforza and by marriage member of the House of Boncompagni.

Early life 
Costanza was daughter of Sforza Sforza, 10th Count di Santa Fiora (1520-1575) and his first wife, Luigia Pallavicino (died in 1552). She was a granddaughter of Costanza Farnese (daughter of Alessandro Farnese, later Pope Paul III).  She married Giacomo Boncompagni, Marquess of Vignola, and Duke of Sora.

Lavinia Fontana, a prominent Bolognese artist, painted her portrait in 1594. A year later, Constanza served as the namesake and godmother of Fontana's daughter.

Notes

References 

 Murphy, Caroline P. (1996). "Lavinia Fontana and 'Le Dame Citta': understanding female artistic patronage in late sixteenth-century Bologna." Renaissance Studies 10 (2). pp. 190–208. JSTOR.

1550 births
1617 deaths
Italian duchesses
Costanza
Date of birth unknown
Date of death unknown
Place of birth unknown
Place of death unknown
16th-century Italian women
17th-century Italian women